See What You Know is an early American television game show that was broadcast on CBS television for four seasons starting in January 1946 and ending for three years in syndication until 1949. It was hosted by Bennett Cerf.

Activities in one episode had guests at a table that contained sound-effects equipment. As Cerf read excerpts from a play, the participants had to create appropriate sounds. Guests on the program included Andre Baruch, Bess Myerson, and Lew Parker.

Critical response
While commending the use of visual activities on the program, a "Second Reviewing" in the trade publication Billboard said that Cerf was "neither telegenic nor amusing" and described the episode reviewed as proceeding "on its usual flubdubbery way, with an impact rating of zero."

References

1940s American game shows
1946 American television series debuts
1949 American television series endings
CBS original programming